Nesos may refer to:
Mount Nesos, a mountain of the Antarctic
Nesos (Greece), a town of ancient Acarnania, Greece